Germaine Kerjean (1893–1975) was a French stage and film actress. She spent a decade with the Comédie-Française. In films she frequently played character roles.

Filmography

References

Bibliography
 Crisp, Colin. French Cinema—A Critical Filmography: Volume 2, 1940-1958. Indiana University Press, 2015.

External links

1893 births
French film actresses
French stage actresses
French television actresses
Actresses from Le Havre
1975 deaths
20th-century French actresses